Kaumana Cave is a lava tube created by a 1881 lava flow from Mauna Loa.
The tube has been surveyed at 2.026 miles (2197 m) long making it the 57th longest lava tube in the world.

The cave is located on the island of Hawaiʻi near the city of Hilo.

A collapsed skylight provides easy access to two of the tube's entrances which became a tourist attraction. Some parts of the tube are located under private property, and so are some of the entrances.

See also
 List of longest caves in the United States

References

External links

 Kaumana Cave on ShowCaves
 Raw Sewage And Solid Waste Dumps In Lava Tube Caves of Hawaii Island
 Tourist Caves of Hawaiʻi Island
 Kaumana Cave on RopeWiki

Caves of Hawaii
Lava tubes
Landforms of Hawaii (island)